Van Arkel may refer to:

Chemistry
Van Arkel–de Boer process
Van Arkel–Ketelaar triangle

People
A medieval noble family in the County of Holland founded around 1000 AD near Arkel and lasting until 1412 AD. Their fief was called Land van Arkel.

Other people with this surname include:

Anton Eduard van Arkel (1893–1976), Dutch chemist
Frederique van Arkel (born 2000), Dutch cricketer
Gerrit van Arkel (1858–1918), Dutch architect
Maria van Arkel (c.1385–1415), Dutch noblewoman

Dutch-language surnames
Surnames of Dutch origin